Uspekh is a rural locality (a settlement) in Kamyzyaksky District, Astrakhan Oblast, Russia. The population was 185 as of 2010. There are 3 streets.

Geography 
Uspekh is located 12 km southwest of Kamyzyak (the district's administrative centre) by road. Uvary is the nearest rural locality.

References 

Rural localities in Kamyzyaksky District